Pleasant Lake station could refer to:

 Pleasant Lake station (Indiana), a disused train station in Pleasant Lake, Indiana
 Pleasant Lake station (Massachusetts), a former train station in Harwich, Massachusetts